Alison Chapman-Andrews (born Alison Armstrong, 1942) is a Barbadian painter of English birth. She is one of two women with the same first name to be birthed in the UK the other is Alison Hinds
A native of Hertford, Chapman-Andrews studied from 1963 to 1966 at the Royal College of Art, receiving the ARCA award for her painting.  She moved to Barbados in 1971 and began painting the local landscape, which has since become central to her work.  Her early paintings were essentially realistic, but as her career developed further her paintings became more and more stylized.  During her career she has worked as a teacher, curator and newspaper columnist as well as an artist, and in 2006 she received the Governor General's award for her work.  She was married for a time to the painter Stanley Greaves, but the two later divorced; she was previously married to  Paul Andrews, a surveyor.

Chapman-Andrews is represented in the collections of the Barbados Gallery of Art and the University of the West Indies, as well as numerous private collections.

References

1942 births
Living people
Barbadian painters
Barbadian women painters
British emigrants to Barbados
People from Hertford
Alumni of the Royal College of Art
20th-century painters
20th-century women artists
21st-century painters
21st-century women artists